The Munich Cosmic Circle was a group of writers and intellectuals in Munich, Germany at the turn of the 20th century, founded by esotericist Alfred Schuler (1865–1923), philosopher Ludwig Klages (1872–1956), and poet Karl Wolfskehl (1869–1948). Other members of the group included writer Ludwig Derleth (1870–1948) and the "Bohemian Countess" of Schwabing, Fanny zu Reventlow (1871–1918). She wrote about her experiences with the group in her roman à clef Herrn Dames Aufzeichnungen (1913).

Alfred Schuler and Ludwig Klages came to know each other in 1893. With the others they based their early association upon an appreciation of Ibsen's dramas. Another interest was the work of Johann Jakob Bachofen (1815–1887), a Swiss anthropologist and sociologist, and his research into matriarchal clans. They developed a doctrine according to which the West was plagued by downfall and degeneration, caused by the rationalizing and demythologizing effects of Christianity. A way out of this desolate state could, according to the "Cosmic" view, only be found by a return to pagan origins. Schuler was described by Theodor Lessing as "an oddity, a curious mixture of charlatan and genius, a show-off and a visionary". The activities and rituals of the group were often sensationalized in bohemian fin-de-siècle Schwabing.

Some members of the Circle were also active in the group around the poet Stefan George, whom Wolfskehl introduced to the group. Ludwig Klages wrote a book praising his poetry in 1902. George was not a member of the Circle, though he was in close contact with them. 

The group fell apart through an acrimonious dispute in 1904 between Klages, who considered himself a neo-pagan and against any form of organized religion, and the Zionist Wolfskehl, which led to charges of anti-semitism against Klages. Stefan George had also begun to distance himself from Klages' philosophy at this time and defended Wolfskehl against Schuler and Klages.

Notes

Culture in Munich
German philosophy
German male writers
German poets
German poetry
Modern paganism in Germany
Criticism of rationalism
19th-century modern paganism
Literary_circles